In Rhineland-Palatinate, Germany, two police officers were fatally shot at a traffic stop on 31 January 2022. The Public prosecutor's office believes that the two arrested suspects were attempting to cover up their poaching.

Incident
In the early morning of 31 January 2022 two police officers from West-Palatinate police office were on a routine patrol. The officers were in uniform, equipped with bulletproof vests in a civil vehicle. The patrol informed the police control room that they had found "dubious persons" in a car and would now carry out a closer check. The later investigation revealed that there were numerous dead wild animals in the hold of the van. The 24-year-old policewoman was killed with a shot to the head from the shotgun. The investigation showed that she was probably guileless and may have held a flashlight and the suspects' papers in her hand. Shortly afterwards, a second radio message followed: "They shoot at us". The fatal shots were fired at about 4:20 a.m. The 24-year-old female officer was shot in the head and died instantly. The 29-year-old officer was able to shoot back, but was also shot and died from his injuries, when the ambulance arrived. According to police union GdP, the bulletproof vests SK2 used do not protect against large calibre projectiles from a short distance.

The crime took place on Kreisstraße 22 between the towns of Mayweilerhof and Ulmet, a rural area in the district of Kusel on the border of the German state Saarland. The perpetrator or perpetrators fled.

The two officers were able to send a radio message. But reinforcements were unable to save them when they arrived.

Casualties 
The killed officers were a 29-year-old male and a 24-year-old female. The female police officer was studying policing at the time the shooting happened.

Manhunt 
Police in Rhineland-Platinate and police in neighbouring Saarland carried out a massive manhunt. Police are looking for a suspect already known to the police. As the German press Agency reported, the man had been noticed in the past because of an accident hit-and-run and has a firearm license. "We assume several armed perpetrators," said a police spokeswoman. Later it became clear, that police found the drivers licence and the ID-card of Andreas Schmitt at the crime scene.

At 4 p.m. the same day responsible West-Palatinate police issued a press release, stating that initial investigations led to a suspicion of a crime against 38-year-old Andreas Johannes Schmitt from Spiesen-Elversberg. The police are actively searching for the man. Public prosecutors and police are asking the public for help.

In the early evening, the police arrested both the wanted Andreas Schmitt and a 32-year-old suspected accomplice in Sulzbach/Saar. Neither offered any resistance. According to the police, firearms were seized during searches of two objects in Sulzbacher Bahnhofstrasse. A suspect's car was also found on that street with bullet holes.

Investigations 
The investigating judge assumes that the two suspects were on their way to poach in the district of Kusel. Public prosecutor's office believe that both suspects fired shots. During the investigation, a shotgun and a hunting rifle were seized.

Suspects 
The two arrested suspects are friends of each other.

Andreas Schmitt 
The main suspect, Andreas Schmitt, is known to the police for poaching and traffic hit-and-run. However, he has no legally binding criminal record. He is making use of his right to remain silent.

Florian V. 
The 32-year-old Florian V. is known to the police for fraud offences. He has no criminal record as well. Among other things, the alleged accomplice was targeted by the investigators because, according to media information, he called Schmitt's wife after the shooting. He later admitted to the poaching, according to the prosecutor's office. He had also described the police control. However, he denies having shot himself.

The suspect later made a comprehensive statement and heavily incriminated Andreas Schmidt. He said when the police officers asked for his hunting license, he said he had to get it out of the car. Instead, Schmitt got the shotgun out of the car and shot the female officer and then shot at the male officer. Schmitt instructed him to find his ID or he would kill him too, he said.

Reactions 
Federal Interior Minister Nancy Faeser (SPD) said: "Regardless of the motive behind the crime, this act is reminiscent of an execution, and it shows that police officers risk their lives every day for our safety."

References

2022 in Germany
2020s crimes in Germany
21st century in Rhineland-Palatinate
Crime in Rhineland-Palatinate
January 2022 crimes in Europe
January 2022 events in Germany
Deaths by firearm in Germany
German police officers killed in the line of duty